The Bishop of Burnley is an episcopal title used by a suffragan bishop of the Church of England Diocese of Blackburn, in the Province of York, England.

The title takes its name after the town of Burnley in Lancashire. Originally, the suffragan bishops were appointed for the diocese of Manchester, but with the creation of the Diocese of Blackburn in 1926, Burnley came under the jurisdiction of the Bishop of Blackburn.

List of bishops

References

External links
 

Bishops of Burnley
Anglican suffragan bishops in the Diocese of Blackburn